Guido Pella was the defending champion, but chose not to defend his title.

Peđa Krstin won the title, defeating Marcelo Arévalo 6–4, 6–2 in the final.

Seeds

Draw

Finals

Top half

Bottom half

References
 Main Draw
 Qualifying Draw

San Luis Open Challenger Tour - Singles
San Luis Potosí Challenger